The Mato Grosso Plateau (Planalto do Mato Grosso) is a plateau in central Brazil occupying most of the state of Mato Grosso. It contains mostly savanna and woodland. It is an ancient erosional plateau that extends from the border of Goiás state westward to the Parecis plateau, which lies near the Bolivian border. In the south it gives way to floodplains called the Pantanal.

The plateau is home to indigenous peoples, such as the Xavante.

References

Physiographic provinces